Bheja Fry 2 is an Indian comedy film released on 17 June 2011. It is the sequel to the 2007 low budget but successful film Bheja Fry, and the second release of Bheja Fry series.

The film garnered negative to mixed reviews upon its release but was a success at the boxoffice.

Plot

Ajit Talwar (Kay Kay Menon) is a business tycoon. The movie starts with an interview of Ajit Talwar in a News Channel. Ajit Talwar has a broad business unit. Ajit Talwar is married to Naina Talwar (Rukshar) but still Ajit Talwar is a womanizer who has an affair with his secretary played by Spanta Patel (Kishwer Merchant). Ajit Talwar has a friend Kapoor (Rahul Vohra) whose wife Raveena (Aditi Govitrikar) runs a TV channel. Kapoor invites Ajit to the final episode of Aao Guess Karein, a TV Reality show aired on Kapoor's TV channel. The finalist of the show is the protagonist Bharat Bhushan (Vinay Pathak), who wins  25 Lakh and a chance to journey in a luxurious Cruise. The Executive Producer of the show Ranjini (Minissha Lamba) asks Bharat Bhushan, how would he utilise the prize money. Bhushan says by producing a music album.

Bhushan is an Income Tax Officer and has a friend M. T. Shekharan (Suresh Menon) who is also an Income Tax Officer. Shekharan calls on Bhushan for an Income Tax Raid. But Bhushan refuses saying that he is leaving for a holiday on a luxurious Cruise. Shekharan follows Ajit Talwar to the cruise ship and employs various disguises to collect evidence on Ajit Talwar. Ajit and Bhushan get lost in an island. Bhushan makes his way to the Cruise with all preparations and thus the hilarious journey begins.

Cast
 Vinay Pathak as Bharat Bhushan
 Kay Kay Menon as Ajit Talwar
 Minissha Lamba as Ranjini
 Amol Gupte as Raghu Burman
 Suresh Menon as M. T. Shekharan
 Virendra Saxena as Viru Chacha
 Aditi Govitrikar as Raveena Kapoor
 Rahul Vohra as Kapoor
 Rukhsar Rehman as Naina Talwar
 Kishwer Merchant as Spanta Patel
 Amit Behl as Raviraj
 Rahul Singh as Dharam Bharti

Reception
The film got negative reviews however it became a semi hit at the box office.

Sequel
Sagar Ballary, director of Bheja Fry series said in 2018 that he has some ideas for the third part. Ballary stated - "We have an idea and some concept. We would like to make it definitely, we want to do it but as I am working on other films right now so 'Bheja Fry' is not going to happen immediately". But no significant steps has been taken as of March, 2023.

Soundtrack

The music of the film was composed by Ishq Bector, Sneha Khanwalkar and Sagar Desai. Lyrics were penned by Shree D., Sonny Ravan and Shakeel Mohammed.

Track listing

References

External links

2011 films
2010s Hindi-language films
2011 comedy films
Indian comedy films
Films shot in India
Indian sequel films
Films scored by Sneha Khanwalkar
Films scored by Ishq Bector
Films directed by Sagar Ballary
Hindi-language comedy films